Brighton Council is a local government body in Tasmania, situated in the south-east of the state, north of Hobart. The Brighton local government area is classified as urban and has a population of 18,995, it is based in the town of Brighton but also covers the far northern Hobart suburbs of Bridgewater, Gagebrook, Honeywood and Old Beach.

History and attributes
The municipality was established on 1 January 1863. Its boundaries were substantially altered during a later reorganisation and a portion of the municipality became part of the Southern Midlands.

Brighton is classified as urban, regional and small (URS) under the Australian Classification of Local Governments.

Government

Suburbs

Not in above List
 Boyer
 Magra
 Otago

See also
List of local government areas of Tasmania

References

External links
Brighton Council official website
Local Government Association Tasmania
Tasmanian Electoral Commission - local government

Local government areas of Tasmania
Brighton Council